Ian Royston Jones (born 24 January 1953), better known as Bruce Jones, is an English actor. He is best known for his role as taxi driver Les Battersby in Coronation Street. He left the role in 2007.

Early life
Jones was born to Bruce and Irene Jones in Collyhurst, Manchester. He was brought up in a typical working-class household before he went to live with his grandmother in Wales where he joined his school drama group at the age of eleven and dreamt of becoming an actor.

Career

Early career

Jones' first introduction into show business was when he formed a comedy duo with a friend, and went to work on the club circuit as "Clarke and Jones" for many years. He began using his father's name as his stage name.

It was during this time that Jones decided to try to act, and his first big break came in 1993 when he was cast as the lead role of Bob Williams in the feature film Raining Stones by director Ken Loach. The film won the Evening Standard British Film Awards for Best Film and Best Screenplay. Jones was presented with the European Actors Award.

In 1995, Jones had a role as a prostitute's client in Band of Gold. In 1996 he appeared as Bob in the film Bob's Weekend, then went on a UK national tour of The Wonderful World of Pantomime produced by Broomstick Productions playing the part of the "Good Robber" alongside playwright Charlotte Jones and Stuart Wolfenden (Coronation Streets'''s Mark Casey) and directed by Gary Broomhead. In 1997, he had a small part in the film The Full Monty. He played one of the males who auditioned to be a stripper, and he received the Stage Actor's Guild Award, (SAG). He also appeared in the Shane Meadows film Twenty Four Seven with actor Bob Hoskins in 1997.

Coronation Street
In June 1997, Jones joined the cast of the ITV soap Coronation Street, playing the role of the outspoken rogue, Les Battersby.

Over the following years, Jones gained numerous credits for film and television productions including: Heartbeat, A Touch of Frost, Roughnecks, and Hillsborough. Jones appeared as Dean Martin in Celebrity Stars in Your Eyes, Mr. Bumble in Oliver for Children in Need and the Robber in Granada's televised Christmas pantomime Cinderella. He also made several television appearances in game shows and chat shows.

In March 2007, he was suspended from Coronation Street after allegedly getting drunk with an undercover reporter, making inappropriate comments and revealing future storylines. It was confirmed in May that he would not be returning to the show, and would be suspended until his contract ended in September.

After Coronation Street
He performed stand-up comedy routines in Benidorm. On 23 March 2008, Jones featured in Celebrity Wife Swap with Sinitta. Jones played Mick the Manager in the film Souled Out, and also appeared on the TV programme The Dark Side of Fame with Piers Morgan.

Jones took part in the BBC One show Famous, Rich and Homeless, which was broadcast in June 2009. He was joined by four other celebrities who would leave their life of fame and fortune for the cold and lonely streets of London. Jones was clearly the most affected by the experience, regularly seen breaking into tears and considering pulling out of the programme. In a state of frustration, desperation and anger, Jones ranted to the camera expressing his support to the idea of returning the death penalty to the UK, in order to allow money to be freed to aid the homeless and the elderly. In his rant, Jones said that "rippers" should all be hanged in order for taxpayers' money to be spent on the homeless and pensioners instead. He added that he would "smile at him" as it happened and referenced his horrific discovery of one of the Yorkshire Ripper's victims, describing himself as a victim.

In November 2009, Jones appeared in Celebrity Come Dine with Me. The competition also featured presenter Yvette Fielding, Atomic Kitten member Natasha Hamilton and was won by former Catchphrase  host Roy Walker.

Jones appeared as King Rat in pantomime Dick Whittington at the Contemporary Urban Centre from 14 December 2009 until 3 January 2010.

In 2009, he worked with Manchester-based production company "Gritish Films", featuring in the short film Down Our Way, alongside Inspiral Carpets vocalist Clint Boon and actor Gary Graham Smith.

He published his ghostwritten autobiography in November 2011.

Jones performed as Captain Hook and Mr. Darling in Peter Pan at the Blackfriars Arts Centre, Boston, Lincolnshire over the 2011 Christmas period. He struggled with this role and was reported to have lost his voice; despite his alcoholism, he continued to drink throughout the run of the show.

In April 2012, Jones appeared in a music video for the British rock band Never A Hero which was featured on Kerrang! TV.

In October 2012, Jones commissioned author and playwright Huw Roberts to write a monologue about tackling and recovering from depression. Starring Jones, TALK!! Tackling the Taboo premiered at Theatre Colwyn, Colwyn Bay, North Wales in April 2013.

On 22 August 2013, Jones entered the Celebrity Big Brother house with his on-screen Coronation Street ex-wife, Vicky Entwistle and on 6 September 2013, he was the fourth housemate to be evicted losing to Abz Love, Courtney Stodden, Lauren Harries, Louie Spence and Entwistle.

In the Netflix series The Ripper (episode: "Between Now and Dawn"), Jones spoke of his involvement in the discovery of the body of Jean Jordan and how it affected him.

Return to feature films
By May 2013, Jones had been cast for two new feature films (boxing film The Journeyman and British gangster thriller Looters, Tooters and Sawn-Off Shooters).

In April 2014, production started on a Welsh feature film called Cream where Jones plays the lead character Ron Harris. Filming took place in and around Llandudno in North Wales.

Charity work
In 2004, Jones was awarded the Silver Heart by the Variety Club of Great Britain in acknowledgement of his charity work. On 16 February 2011, Jones made an appearance for the Sir Norman Wisdom tribute at De Montfort Hall in Leicester, raising money for the Roy Castle Fund; he spoke of Wisdom's time on Coronation Street.

Personal life
Jones married Sue Margaret Bailey on 12 June 1971 at St. Oswald's Church, Collyhurst. The couple had two sons, John and Sebastien. The couple divorced in 1982. In 1984, Jones married Sandra; the couple had two children and lived in Marple.

On the morning of 9 October 1977, Jones discovered the mutilated body of 20-year-old Jean Jordan on an allotment in Chorlton, Manchester – a victim of the "Yorkshire Ripper", Peter Sutcliffe. Despite being innocent, Jones was treated as a suspect, and lost his first wife and children as a result.

In 1998, he pleaded guilty to drink driving after being tested by police and found to be more than twice the legal limit, Jones was banned from driving for three years. By 2000, his alcoholism became so heavy that he spent a period in the celebrity rehab clinic the Priory.

In August 2009, Jones grabbed and repeatedly jerked the steering wheel of his car whilst his wife was driving it on the A55 in North Wales, causing it to swerve. On 19 March 2010 at Mold Crown Court, he pleaded guilty to dangerous driving and drink-driving. His wife told the court that he had physically and emotionally abused her for years. On 27 April 2010, the same court sentenced him to eight months imprisonment, suspended for eighteen months.

Jones told The People newspaper in January 2009 that he had blown his £1,000,000 fortune and had not received any offers of work since leaving Coronation Street, and owed £30,000 in taxes. In September 2009, he was living alone in a caravan in North Wales. In May 2010, it was reported that Jones had been made homeless after the bank repossessed his £500,000 Cheshire house in order to pay his large debts, and that he could not afford to go into rehab for his chronic alcoholism.

On 15 July 2011, the bank was forced to repossess his second home, a bungalow in North Wales. Court documents reveal that the Bank of Scotland actioned legal proceedings to retrieve £204,641 in outstanding mortgage repayments.

In June 2012, Jones told the Daily Mirror that he had regularly contemplated suicide after losing both his homes. He had been warned by doctors that he would die soon if he did not stop drinking, but said he no longer cared. At the peak of his alcoholism he admitted drinking fifteen pints a day.

In June 2015, Jones appeared in a documentary about celebrities who have hit hard times and rely entirely on social security payments. The programme was called Celebs on Benefits''. He was shown to be in receipt of Jobseeker's Allowance (JSA) and housing benefit payments.

In 2019, Jones hit out against the rollout of Universal Credit, and called for the six-week wait for the first payment to be scrapped, saying it was pushing families into poverty and increasing reliance on foodbanks.

Credits

References

External links

1953 births
Living people
English male film actors
English male television actors
English soap opera actors
Outstanding Performance by a Cast in a Motion Picture Screen Actors Guild Award winners
People from Collyhurst
Male actors from Manchester
20th-century English male actors
21st-century English male actors
Peter Sutcliffe